The following is a list of events, births, and deaths in 1932 in Switzerland.

Incumbents
Federal Council:
Giuseppe Motta (President)
Edmund Schulthess 
Jean-Marie Musy
Heinrich Häberlin
Marcel Pilet-Golaz
Albert Meyer
Rudolf Minger

Tournaments
1931–32 Nationalliga
Switzerland at the 1932 Summer Olympics
Switzerland at the 1932 Winter Olympics
1932–33 Nationalliga

Establishments

Events by Month

January
January 9-Émile Ess, a Swiss rower, is born (d. December 1990)

February
February 11-Kurt Schmid, a Swiss rower, is born

March

April
April 9-Armin Jordan, a Swiss conductor, is born (d. September 2006)

May

June

July
July 20-Alice Fischer, a Swiss figure skater, is born
July 29-Walter Loosli, a Swiss sculptor, woodcut engraver and maker of stained and painted glass panels and windows, is born
July 29-Luigi Snozzi, a Swiss architect, is born

August
August 21-Kurt Stettler, a Swiss football (association football) goalkeeper, is born

September
September 8-Tannenberg, a Swiss-German war film, is released

October

November
November 2-Clemens Thoma,a Swiss theologian, is born
November 4-Katia Loritz, a Swiss born actress, is born
November 12-Edmond Louis Budry, a Swiss hymn writer, died

December
December 21-Werner Otto Leuenberger, a Swiss painter, illustrator, graphic artist and sculptor, is born
December 29-Cornelio Sommaruga, an Italian born Swiss humanitarian, lawyer and diplomat, is born

Other
Geneva Conference (1932) is held
June 16-July 9-Lausanne Conference of 1932 is held in Switzerland
Emilie Benes Brzezinski, a Swiss born American sculptor, is born
Louis Mercanton, a Swiss film director, screenwriter and actor, dies

References

 
1932 in Swiss sport
1932 in Europe
Years of the 20th century in Switzerland